Oedudes is a genus of longhorn beetles of the subfamily Lamiinae, containing the following species:

 Oedudes alayoi (Zayas, 1956)
 Oedudes annulatus Lingafelter, 2013
 Oedudes bifasciata (Bates, 1869)
 Oedudes callizona (Bates, 1881)
 Oedudes ramsdeni (Fisher, 1926)
 Oedudes roberto (Fisher, 1935)
 Oedudes scaramuzzai (Fisher, 1936)
 Oedudes spectabilis (Drury, 1782)

References

Hemilophini